Sergey Boytsov (15 August 1994, Klin, Moscow Oblast, Russia) is a Russian model, bodybuilder, extremal and public figure. Master of Sports of Russia in bodybuilding. Absolute winner of the Moscow championship in the category “Men's Physique” (2015), bronze medalist of the Russian Cup in bodybuilding among young men (2012).

Biography 

Sergey Boytsov was born in Klin, Moscow Oblast, Russia.

Education 

In 2009–2012, he studied in college.

In 2018, Sergey Boytsov graduated from the Russian State University of Physical Education, Sport, Youth and Tourism with a degree in “Coacher-teacher”.

Sports career 

In 2011, at the age of 17, Sergey decided to compete in bodybuilding competitions among young men. His training was conducted by the coacher Dmitry Yashankin, champion of Arnold Classic USA 2012. For six months, Sergey was able to get in shape, which allowed him to enter the top ten athletes in Russia in the category of “Young Men”.

At the first Russian championship in his life, Sergey took 3rd place out of 6 participants.

In 2012, he fulfilled the standard of the Master of Sports of Russia in bodybuilding, becoming a bronze medalist in the category “Bodybuilding (boys)” at the Cup of Russia in Stavropol.

In 2014, Sergey made his debut in the “Men's Physique” category. In this category, the main criteria are body proportions and aesthetics.

In the same year, Sergey Boytsov became the vice-champion of the Moscow Oblast in the category “Men's Physique” in the height category from 178 cm.

In 2015, Sergey won a gold medal at the Moscow Oblast championship in the category “Men's Physique” from 178 cm.

In the same year, he became the absolute champion of Moscow in the category “Men's Physique” among 160 participants. Thanks to this victory, Sergey Boytcov qualified for the Amateur Olympia Moscow tournament.

In 2015–2016, Sergey passed the Russian “Race of Heroes”, an extreme cross-country obstacle race organized by the “League of Heroes”.

Performance history 

2012 IFBB Open Cup of Moscow Oblast
2012 FBFR Open Cup of Moscow (FBFR)
2012 FBFR Eastern European Cup/Open Cup of Russia 
2012 IFBB Open Championship of Moscow Oblast 
2012 FBFR Open Championship of Moscow
2012 FBFR Eastern European Championship/ Russian championship

Modeling career 

In November 2011, Sergey Boytsov joined the Uamodel modeling agency, and in 2015, he became the face of this magazine.

Covers

Recognition 

Sergey Boytsov received a diploma for his special contribution to the development of bodybuilding and fitness in Russia.

In 2014, Sergey Boytsov was recognized as the “Man of Dreams” by StarHit magazine.

In November 2014, Sergey was awarded a diploma from the Russian Bodybuilding Federation together with the Amateur Olympia tournament for “Special contribution to the development of bodybuilding and fitness in Russia”.

In 2015, Sergey was recognized as the best model of the year by photographer David Vance and became the face of the “5 Russian Boys” book.

In September 2017, Sergey Boytsov received an award and entered the top 100 most stylish people in Russia, according to BLOGGMAGAZINE magazine.

Personal life 
In 2019, Sergey Boytsov married Viktoria Demidova, a businesswoman and founder of fitness apps for smartphones. In 2019, Sergey and Viktoria had a son in Miami — Christian.

Sometime in 2021, Sergey and Viktoria divorced and Sergey began a relationship with Anastasia Sozonik, a blogger.

References

External links 
 
 

Living people
1994 births
People from Klin
Russian bodybuilders
Russian male models
Sportspeople from Moscow Oblast